Nicholas Truesdell (born March 14, 1990) is an American football tight end who is a free agent. He was signed by the Colorado Ice as an undrafted free agent in 2014. He played college football at the University of Cincinnati before transferring to Grand Rapids Community College.

Early life
Born to Richard Scantlebury and Teresa Truesdell, Truesdell attended Anderson High School in his native Cincinnati, Ohio. Standing at 6'7", 215 lb, Truesdell lettered all four years playing as a wide receiver and punter under coach Jeff Gesting. In 2007, he was named All-City Honorable Mention by The Cincinnati Enquirer after helping his high school football team go 13-2 and win the Ohio Division II crown. For his senior season efforts, he was named the Redskins' Offensive MVP as he registered 17 catches for 264 yards (including a season-long 55-yard catch and run) and six touchdowns.

College career
Truesdell decided to stay close to home and enrolled at the University of Cincinnati in 2008. He appeared in six games for the Bearcats' special teams but did not yield any statistics before he was dismissed from the team for stealing from the campus bookstore. Truesdell then had to transfer to Grand Rapids Community College, where he tore his ACL in his first game with the team.

Professional career

Indoor Football League
After not returning to action in college, Truesdell hired an agent tried to land with a pro team. He was invited to the Cincinnati Bengals rookie minicamp in 2013 and also tried out for the Tennessee Titans that year before played for the Colorado Ice (now Crush) and Bemidji Axemen of the Indoor Football League (IFL) in 2014. He played in one game for the Ice and caught one pass for four yards. He played in 7 games for the Axemen, catching 28 passes for 402 yards and 9 touchdowns. He also recorded 11 solo tackles and 1 tackle assist with the Axemen. He was also invited to a rookie minicamp with the Green Bay Packers in 2014 but was not signed.

Arena Football League
Truesdell ended up in the Arena Football League (AFL), where he signed with the Spokane Shock. In his first season, he caught 33 passes for 355 yards and seven touchdowns in nine games. In 2015, he played in all 16 games and delivered his best season to date with 80 receptions, 977 yards and 23 touchdowns for the Shock. In a game against Portland, Truesdell had five touchdown catches in the first half. Truesdell, however, didn’t get a shot at the league record of nine scores in one game because he strained his hamstring. On November 5, 2015, he was assigned to the Portland Thunder (which soon changed its nickname to Steel). In his lone season with the team, he recorded 15 receptions for 200 yards and 8 touchdowns.

Indianapolis Colts
On July 28, 2016, the Indianapolis Colts signed Truesdell to their training camp roster. On July 31, 2016, Truesdell was waived by the team.

Arizona Rattlers
On October 14, 2016, he was selected by the Arizona Rattlers in the fifth round of the dispersal draft.

Cleveland Gladiators
He was then assigned to the Cleveland Gladiators on January 10, 2017. He was placed on reassignment by the Gladiators on March 17, 2017.

Minnesota Vikings
On March 25, 2017, Truesdell performed at the NFL Pro Player Combine (also known as veteran combine), where he impressed some NFL scouts after running the 40-yard dash in 4.47-4.60 seconds while measuring in at 6'6" and 252 lb. He received contract offers from the Oakland Raiders, New York Jets, Cincinnati Bengals, Minnesota Vikings, Los Angeles Rams, Atlanta Falcons, Indianapolis Colts, New York Giants, and the Tennessee Titans. On March 30, 2017, Truesdell signed with the Minnesota Vikings. He was waived on September 2, 2017. He was signed to the Vikings' practice squad on January 16, 2018.

Alliance of American Football
In late 2018, Truesdell joined the Salt Lake Stallions of the Alliance of American Football. In 8 games, Truesdell caught 24 passes for 269 yards and 3 touchdowns; only 3 out of 27 passing attempts thrown his way resulted in incompletions, for a catch rate of 89%.

New York Jets
On August 4, 2019, Truesdell was signed by the New York Jets of the NFL. He was waived on August 13, 2019.

Tampa Bay Vipers
In October 2019, he was selected in the first round of the 2020 XFL Draft by the Tampa Bay Vipers. He had his contract terminated when the league suspended operations on April 10, 2020.

Truesdell was selected by the Aviators of The Spring League during their player selection draft on October 10, 2020.

New Jersey Generals
Truesdell was selected by the New Jersey Generals in the 34th round of the 2022 USFL Draft. He was transferred to the team's inactive roster before the start of the regular season on April 16, 2022, due to a groin injury. He was released on April 28.

AFL statistics

Stats from ArenaFan:

AAF statistics

Personal life
Nick's father, Richard Scantlebury, played professional basketball in England after playing at Coastal Carolina, and Nick's uncle, Peter Scantlebury, received the Most Excellent Order of the British Empire for his contributions to basketball as a player and coach. Peter Scantlebury dunked in a charity game at age 49 in 2013.

References

External links
Cincinnati Bearcats bio
Arena Football League bio

1990 births
Living people
American football wide receivers
Cincinnati Bearcats football players
Colorado Crush (IFL) players
Bemidji Axemen players
Spokane Shock players
Portland Thunder players
Portland Steel players
Arizona Rattlers owners
Players of American football from Cincinnati
Grand Rapids Raiders football players
Cleveland Gladiators players
Minnesota Vikings players
Salt Lake Stallions players
New York Jets players
Tampa Bay Vipers players
The Spring League players
New Jersey Generals (2022) players